Deadly Legacy is a book written by Robin Burcell and published by Avon Books (owned by HarperCollins) on 28 January 2003, which later went on to win the Anthony Award for Best Paperback Original in 2004.

References 

Anthony Award-winning works
American mystery novels
2003 American novels
Avon (publisher) books